Olivia Bowen (née Buckland; born 3 January 1994) is an English reality television personality.

Bowen came second on Love Island in 2016, with Alex Bowen. In 2017, they became engaged and she featured on an episode of Say Yes to the Dress.

In 2017, she launched her own clothing range with MissPap. From July 2017, Buckland started maternity cover for Ferne McCann on This Morning, presenting different features throughout the summer as well as being the resident Love Island reporter alongside Chloe Crowhurst. Buckland also covered for Rylan Clark-Neal on Fridays throughout the summer for the showbiz section of the show whilst he presented the main show.

In 2018, they filmed the TLC programmes, Olivia and Alex Said Yes.

Personal life
Bowen married Alex Bowen on 15 September 2018 in Essex. In June 2022, she gave birth to their son.

References

1994 births
Living people
People from Essex
People from Chelmsford
English female models
English television personalities
Love Island (2015 TV series) contestants